Tamika Paul Mkandawire (born 28 May 1983) is a former professional footballer who played as a midfielder or defender. Born in Malawi, he made two appearances for the England C national team.

Early life
Born in Mzuzu, Mkandawire came to England aged three, with his English mother and Malawian father and was brought up in Rugby, Warwickshire. He later attended Harris High School in Rugby from 1995–1999.

Club career
Mkandawire was a trainee at West Brom for five seasons but did not make an appearance for the first team due to the lack of opportunities at the club at the time. Albion released him in 2004 after winning promotion to the Premier League.

Hereford United
Having had two loan spells with Hereford United in the 2003–04 season, he signed permanently for them for the 2004–05 season. Prior to this he had a trial in the United States with New England Revolution.

He was a first team regular at centre-back in the 2004–05 season making the most appearances of all the central defenders in the squad. He also chipped in with six goals, more than any other defender that season. This consistency continued into the 2005–06 season where he missed only four matches, and scored nine goals. When club captain Tony James was injured, Mkandawire took the captain's armband and led Hereford to the playoff final, scoring in the crucial semi-final against Morecambe. He lifted the trophy after a 3–2 win over Halifax and was subsequently named Player of the Year, for the second season in succession.

For the 2006–07 season he was named as team captain for Hereford's first season back in the Football League. He was a regular in Hereford's defence, scoring twice in the league, and his solid performances had led to speculation over him moving to a bigger club. Despite an improved contract offer in December 2006, which reportedly would have made him the highest earner in the club's history, he decided that his future lay elsewhere.

Leyton Orient
On 6 June 2007, Mkandawire signed a three-year deal with Leyton Orient, who had previously seen a £60,000 bid rejected. Dubbed one of the best young centre backs in the Football League, he made his Orient debut in a 2–1 win at Southend United on 11 August 2007. Three weeks later, on 1 September, Mkandawire scored his first goal for the club – and Orient's 5000th in league football – in a 2–2 draw with Northampton Town. His performance in Orient's 1–0 home win over AFC Bournemouth on 8 September 2007 earned him a place in the League One Team of the Week.

Millwall

On 16 June 2010, Millwall acquired Mkandawire's services until 30 June 2012 on a free transfer. He has adapted to playing a new defensive holding midfield role for Millwall, switching from his usual central defence position. He scored his first goal for The Lions on 10 December 2010, in a 1–1 draw against Swansea City. Mkandawire was named Millwall's Player of the Year for 2011, garnering 44% of the vote and playing for the majority of the year in a new defensive midfield/centre back role.

Shrewsbury Town
Mkandawire joined Shrewsbury Town in League One on a free transfer on 1 July 2013 following his release from Millwall. He was named club captain by manager Graham Turner, and made his Shrewsbury debut against Milton Keynes Dons on 3 August 2013. Following Shrewsbury's relegation, Mkandawire was released on 2 June 2014, having come to an agreement with the club to end his contract early.

Tampa Bay Rowdies
The North American Soccer League's Tampa Bay Rowdies signed Mkandawire on 4 July 2014, along with Argentine striker Luciano Olguín. General manager Perry Van der Beck hopes Mkandawire will add poise and experience to the Rowdies' back line. Mkandawire signed a new contract to remain in Tampa Bay on 15 January 2018.

International career
He holds a United Kingdom citizenship and has played for the English semi-professional team. Malawi does not allow dual citizenship therefore Tamika is currently ineligible to play for Malawi at full international level.

Personal life
Mkandawire is an active fundraiser for charity work in Malawi and in January 2009, he became Ambassador for Sue Ryder international. In March 2012, Tamika won the 'PFA Player in the Community' award at the Football League Awards.

Career statistics
''

References

External links

Tampa Bay Rowdies profile page

1983 births
Living people
People from Mzimba District
Malawian footballers
English footballers
England semi-pro international footballers
Association football defenders
West Bromwich Albion F.C. players
Hereford United F.C. players
Leyton Orient F.C. players
Millwall F.C. players
Southend United F.C. players
Shrewsbury Town F.C. players
English Football League players
National League (English football) players
Malawian emigrants to the United Kingdom
Black British sportspeople
Tampa Bay Rowdies players
English expatriate footballers
Expatriate soccer players in the United States
North American Soccer League players
English expatriate sportspeople in the United States